Secret Celebrity Renovation is an American reality television series that premiered on CBS on July 9, 2021. The series is hosted by Nischelle Turner of Entertainment Tonight, who is accompanied by a design team initially consisting of interior designer Sabrina Soto and home improvement contractor Jason Cameron; for the series' second season, Cameron was replaced by "Boston Rob" Mariano, a general contractor and former contestant on multiple seasons of the reality competition series Survivor, who had previously appeared on SCR as the featured celebrity in the season 1 finale. 

In March 2022, the series was renewed for a second season which premiered on July 29, 2022.

Production
On December 14, 2020, it was announced that CBS had ordered the series with Nischelle Turner as the host and Robert Horowitz, Lewis Fenton and Peter DeVitaas as the executive producers. On June 14, 2021, it was announced that the series would premiere on July 9, 2021. On March 9, 2022, CBS renewed the series for a second season which premiered on July 29, 2022.

Episodes

Series overview

Season 1 (2021)

Season 2 (2022)

Ratings

References

External links

2020s American reality television series
2021 American television series debuts
CBS original programming
Celebrity reality television series
English-language television shows
Home renovation television series